A clinical biologist is a health professional such as a doctor of medicine, pharmacist, chemist or biologist that is specialized in clinical biology, a medical specialty derived from clinical pathology. The concept includes interventional biology, including assisted reproductive technology.

These professionals follow a medical residency whose duration varies between countries (from 3 to 5 years).

This term is frequently used in France, Belgium and other countries in Western Europe, Africa or Asia.

See also 

 Biological pharmacist
 Medical laboratory
 Clinical laboratory scientist
 Clinical pathology

Pathology